Hala El-Moughrabi (born June 6, 1959) is a Syrian retired olympic sprinter 
and athlete. She represented Syria in 1980 Summer Olympics in Moscow. She was also a multiple silver and bronze medalist at the Arab Athletics Championships and a bronze medalist in the  relay at the 1987 Mediterranean Games.

Personal bests
400 m – 59.33 (Moscow 1980)
800 m – 2:10.3  NR (Damascus 1987)
1500 m – 4:45.62 (Helsinki 1983)

Competition record

Olympic participation

Moscow 1980
El-Mogharabi and Dia Toutingi were the only female participants for Syria in that tournament among a total of 67 participant for Syria.

Athletics – Track events

References

External links
 
 Hala El-Moughrabi at Olympedia

1959 births
Living people
Athletes (track and field) at the 1980 Summer Olympics
Syrian female athletes
Olympic athletes of Syria